Elections to the French National Assembly were held in French Dahomey on 10 November 1946. The territory elected a single member to the Assembly. Sourou-Migan Apithy was the only candidate, and was elected unopposed. Voter turnout was 59.1%.

Results

References

Elections in Benin
Dahomey
1946 in French Dahomey
1946-11
1946 elections in France